Blues Matters! is a bimonthly British blues magazine.

History
Blues Matters! was founded by Alan Pearce in 1999. It is published on a bimonthly basis. Alan King and Darren Howells (until 2009) previously served as the magazine's editor-in-chief.

The Blues Foundation, in Memphis, Tennessee, awarded the magazine the "Keeping the Blues Alive" (KBA) Award for 2007, in the Print Media category. This is only the second time a British publication has received the award, and the first time for a Welsh production. Previous recipients have included major titles, such as Rolling Stone. Blues Matters! is also the recipient of the European Blues Awards 2014 in the category of best publication.

References

External links
 Blues Matters website

Bi-monthly magazines published in the United Kingdom
Music magazines published in the United Kingdom
Blues music magazines
Magazines established in 1999
1999 establishments in the United Kingdom